No Culpes a La Noche - The Club Remixes is a remix album from Mexican singer Luis Miguel. The album made its debut on number 16 to later climb up to number 3 in the Top 100 Mexican Charts. Luis Miguel's latest work has been certified gold and platinum for shipments of over 120,000 copies. On States side, the album charted for a week at #180 on the Billboard 200 and peaked at number 4 in the Billboard Latin Albums Charts.

Track listing

Sales and certifications

References

Luis Miguel remix albums
2009 remix albums
Warner Music Group remix albums
Spanish-language remix albums